USS Orion (AC–11) was a collier of the United States Navy. The ship was laid down by the Maryland Steel Co., Sparrows Point, Maryland, on 6 October 1911, launched on 23 March 1912, and commissioned at Norfolk on 29 July 1912.

Construction and design
The ship's launch set a new world's record for rapid construction. The ship, and sister , were built on the patented Isherwood System of longitudinal framing with propulsion machinery in the stern.

Service history

Atlantic Fleet, 1912–1917
Assigned to general collier duty with the Atlantic Fleet in September, Orion remained in the western Atlantic until placed in reserve at Norfolk on 9 October 1914. Recommissioned on 28 December, she continued to serve the Atlantic Fleet until ordered to Cavite in January 1917.

World War I, 1917–1918
Orion was at Colón in the Canal Zone when the United States entered World War I in April 1917. Orion remained there until 21 May, then returned to Norfolk, whence she steamed to the Azores for operations during June and July. During the latter month, she also assisted in placing a defensive chain across the harbor at Ponta Delgada.

While in Ponta Delgada, the large German cruiser-type U-boat SM U-155 bombarded the port on July 4 at 3 a.m. The resulting attack damaged several buildings and killed four civilians.  To the surprise of the German U-boat crew, as they did not see Orion, Orion's crew responded with its 3-inch gun and engaged in a gun duel with the U-boat for about twelve minutes.  Neither vessel hit the other, but U-155 eventually withdrew from the action. The Portuguese government later awarded Orion'''s crew the Order of the Tower and Sword in thanks.

During the fall she served on the east coast from Norfolk to Boston, then, in January 1918, joined the Naval Overseas Transportation Service (NOTS).

Continuing her collier duties under NOTS, she served on general duty in Chesapeake Bay until she steamed south again in April. In May, she off-loaded coal at Montevideo, then headed back toward New York. Just after departing the former, she sighted an enemy submarine and fired on it, chasing it off. On arrival back in the United States, she resumed her more mundane coastal collier duties.

Pacific Fleet, 1918–1925
After the end of the war and the completion of a coal run to France, Orion'' returned to the United States, and on 5 February 1919 was detached from NOTS and assigned to duty with the Atlantic Fleet. In June, she steamed to the west coast where she joined the Pacific Fleet and for the next year resupplied ports on the west coasts of both North and South America. In August, she was transferred to the Naval Transport Service, then on maneuvers in the West Indies, and with that service continued to supply fleet units until December 1925.

Decommissioning and sale
Then ordered inactivated, she decommissioned at Norfolk on 18 June 1926. Struck from the Naval Vessel Register on 10 July 1931, she was sold to the Union Ship Building Co., Baltimore, Maryland on 30 August 1933.

References

Bibliography

External links

Naval Historical Center Online Library of Selected Images: USS Orion
United States Naval Collier Orion: Built in Record Time

Colliers of the United States Navy
Ships built in Sparrows Point, Maryland
1912 ships
World War I auxiliary ships of the United States